Live Scenes from New York is a 3-disc live album by progressive metal band Dream Theater, recorded on August 30, 2000, at the Roseland Ballroom in New York City. Live Scenes from New York is the audio counterpart to the Metropolis 2000: Scenes from New York DVD, released in 2001, except only the CD has the full concert. The third disc contains two videos of the concert that are not on the DVD, the music video for "Another Day", and Jordan Rudess's keyboard solo. This is Dream Theater's first live release with Rudess and first full-length live release.

Drummer Mike Portnoy collapsed after the concert. He said, "I collapsed due to over-exhaustion, dehydration, stress, too little food and nutrition, too many Red Bulls, etc. It took me several hours of throwing up, being wrapped in blankets and laying down before I was carried out of the venue hours after the show."

Cover artwork
Coincidentally, the album was originally released on September 11, 2001. Because the cover artwork depicts the New York skyline, including the twin towers of the World Trade Center, in flames, it was recalled and re-released shortly with the band's Majesty symbol in gold instead. The original artwork was based on the cover for Dream Theater's 1992 album Images and Words, which includes a heart in flames and wrapped in barbed wire. In the heart’s place for this release was an apple instead, for New York City’s nickname "The Big Apple".

Track listing
All music was composed by Dream Theater except where noted.

Disc three also contains the video for "Another Day" and the keyboard solo.

Personnel
 James LaBrie – lead vocals; percussion
 John Myung – bass
 John Petrucci – guitars; backing vocals
 Mike Portnoy – drums; backing vocals
 Jordan Rudess – keyboards

Additional personnel
 Theresa Thomason - Guest Vocals on "Through Her Eyes" and "The Spirit Carries On"
 Gospel Choir - on "The Spirit Carries On"
 Jo Marno - Choir Coordinator
 Jay Beckenstein - Soprano Sax on "Another Day"
 Kent Broadhurst - The Hypnotherapist

Chart performance

References

Dream Theater live albums
2001 live albums
Elektra Records live albums